The Treaty of Zaragoza, also called the Capitulation of Zaragoza (alternatively spelled Saragossa) was a peace treaty between Castile and Portugal, signed on 22 April 1529 by King John III of Portugal and the Castilian emperor Charles V, in the Aragonese city of Zaragoza. The treaty defined the areas of Castilian and Portuguese influence in Asia, in order to resolve the "Moluccas issue", which had arisen because both kingdoms claimed the Maluku Islands for themselves, asserting that they were within their area of influence as specified in 1494 by the Treaty of Tordesillas. The conflict began in 1520, when expeditions of both kingdoms reached the Pacific Ocean, because no agreed meridian of longitude had been established in the Orient.

Background: the Moluccas issue 

In 1494 Castile and Portugal signed the Treaty of Tordesillas, dividing the world into two areas of exploration and colonisation: the Castilian and the Portuguese. It established a meridian in the Atlantic Ocean, with areas west of the line exclusive to Spain, and east of the line to Portugal.

In 1511, Malacca, then the centre of Asian trade, was conquered for Portugal by Afonso de Albuquerque. Getting to know the secret location of the so-called "spice islands" – the Banda Islands, Ternate and Tidore in Maluku Islands (modern Indonesia), then the single world source of nutmeg and cloves, and the main purpose for the European explorations in the Indian Ocean – Albuquerque sent an expedition led by António de Abreu in search of the Moluccas, particularly the Banda Islands. The expedition arrived in early 1512, passing en route through the Lesser Sunda Islands, being the first Europeans to get there.  Before reaching Banda, the explorers visited the islands of Buru, Ambon and Seram. Later, after a separation forced by a shipwreck, Abreu's vice-captain Francisco Serrão sailed to the north and, but his ship sank off Ternate, where he obtained a license to build a Portuguese fortress-factory: the Forte de São João Baptista de Ternate.

Letters describing the "Spice Islands", from Serrão to Ferdinand Magellan, who was his friend and possibly a cousin, helped Magellan persuade the Spanish crown to finance the first circumnavigation of the earth. On 6 November 1521, the Moluccas, "the cradle of all spices", were reached from the east by Magellan's fleet, sailing then under Juan Sebastián Elcano, at the service of the Spanish Crown. Before Magellan and Serrão could meet in the islands, Serrão died on the island of Ternate, almost at the same time Magellan was killed in the battle of Mactan in the Philippines.

After the Magellan–Elcano expedition (1519–1522), Charles V sent a second expedition, led by García Jofre de Loaísa, to colonise the islands, based on the assertion that they were in the Castilian zone, under the Treaty of Tordesillas. After some difficulties, the expedition reached Maluku Islands, docking at Tidore, where the Spanish established a fort. There was inevitable conflict with the Portuguese, who were already established in Ternate. After a year of fighting, the Spanish suffered a defeat but, despite that, nearly a decade of skirmishes over the possession of the islands ensued.

Conference of Badajoz–Elvas 

In 1524, both kingdoms organised the "Junta de Badajoz–Elvas" to resolve the dispute. Each crown appointed three astronomers and cartographers, three pilots and three mathematicians, who formed a committee to establish the exact location of the antimeridian of Tordesillas, and the intention was to divide the whole world into two equal hemispheres.

The Portuguese delegation sent by King João III included António de Azevedo Coutinho, Diogo Lopes de Sequeira, and Lopo Homem, a cartographer and cosmographer. The plenipotentiary from Portugal was Mercurio Gâtine, and those from Spain were Count Mercurio Gâtine, Garcia de Loaysa, Bishop of Osma, and García de Padilla, grand master of the Order of Calatrava. Former Portuguese cartographer Diogo Ribeiro, was part of the Spanish delegation.

An amusing story is said to have taken place at this meeting.  According to contemporary Castilian writer Peter Martyr d'Anghiera, a small boy stopped the Portuguese delegation and asked if they intended to divide up the world.  The delegation answered that they were.  The boy responded by baring his backside and suggesting that they draw their line through his butt crack.

The board met several times, at Badajoz and Elvas, without reaching an agreement. Geographic knowledge at that time was inadequate for an accurate assignment of longitude, and each group chose maps or globes that showed the islands to be in their own hemisphere. John III and Charles V agreed to not send anyone else to the Moluccas until it was established in whose hemisphere they were situated.

Between 1525 and 1528 Portugal sent several expeditions to the area around Maluku Islands. Gomes de Sequeira and Diogo da Rocha were sent by the governor of Ternate Jorge de Meneses to the Celebes (also already visited by Simão de Abreu in 1523) and to the north. The expeditioners were the first Europeans to reach the Caroline Islands, which they named "Islands de Sequeira ". Explorers such as Martim Afonso de Melo (1522-24), and possible Gomes de Sequeira (1526-1527), sighted the Aru Islands and the Tanimbar Islands. In 1526 Jorge de Meneses reached northwestern Papua New Guinea, landing in Biak in the Schouten Islands, and from there he sailed to Waigeo on the Bird's Head Peninsula.

On the other hand, in addition to the Loaísa expedition from Spain to the Moluccas (1525-1526), the Castilians sent an expedition there via the Pacific, led by Álvaro de Saavedra Cerón (1528) (prepared by Hernán Cortés in Mexico), in order to compete with the Portuguese in the region. Members of the Garcia Jofre de Loaísa expedition were taken prisoner by the Portuguese, who returned the survivors to Europe by the western route. Álvaro de Saavedra Cerón reached the Marshall Islands, and in two failed attempts to return from Maluku Islands via the Pacific, explored part of west and northern New Guinea, also reaching the Schouten Islands and sighting Yapen, as well as the Admiralty Islands and the Carolines.

On 10 February 1525, Charles V's younger sister Catherine of Austria married John III of Portugal, and on 11 March 1526, Charles V married king John's sister Isabella of Portugal. These crossed weddings strengthened the ties between the two crowns, facilitating an agreement regarding the Moluccas. It was in the interests of the emperor to avoid conflict, so that he could focus on his European policy, and the Spaniards did not know then how to get spices from the Maluku Islands to Europe via the eastern route. The Manila-Acapulco route was only established by Andrés de Urdaneta in 1565.

Treaty 
The Treaty of Zaragoza laid down that the eastern border between the two domain zones was  leagues (1,763 kilometres, 952 nautical miles), or 17° east, of the Maluku Islands.  This left the islands within the Portuguese domain. In exchange, the King of Portugal paid Emperor Charles V 350,000 gold ducats. The treaty included a safeguard clause which stated that the deal would be undone if at any time the emperor wished to revoke it, with the Portuguese being reimbursed the money they had to pay, and each nation "will have the right and the action as that is now." That never happened however, because the emperor desperately needed the Portuguese money to finance the War of the League of Cognac against his archrival Francis I of France.

The treaty did not clarify or modify the line of demarcation established by the Treaty of Tordesillas, nor did it validate Spain's claim to equal hemispheres (180° each), so the two lines divided the Earth into unequal portions. Portugal's portion was roughly 191° of the Earth's circumference, whereas Spain's portion was roughly 169°. There was a ±4° margin of uncertainty as to the exact size of both portions, due to the variation of opinion about the precise location of the Tordesillas line.

Under the treaty, Portugal gained control of all lands and seas west of the line, including all of Asia and its neighbouring islands so far "discovered", leaving Spain with most of the Pacific Ocean. Although the Philippines was not mentioned in the treaty, Spain implicitly relinquished any claim to it because it was well west of the line. Nevertheless, by 1542, King Charles V had decided to colonise the Philippines, assuming that Portugal would not protest too vigorously because the archipelago had no spices. Although he failed in his attempt, King Philip II succeeded in 1565, establishing the initial Spanish trading post at Manila. As his father had expected, there was little opposition from the Portuguese.

In later times, Portuguese colonization in Brazil during the Iberian Union extended far west of the line defined in the Treaty of Tordesillas and into what would have been Spanish territory under the treaty, later on new limits were drawn in the Treaty of Madrid (13 January 1750) stablishing the current limits of Brazil.

See also 
 141st meridian east
 Indonesia–Papua New Guinea relations
 South Australia–Victoria border dispute
....

Notes

References

External links 
 Transcription of the Spanish-language version of the Treaty, by Cristóbal Bernal
 Yasuo Miyakawa. "The changing iconography of Japanese political geography," GeoJournal, Vol. 52, No. 4, Iconographies (2000), pp. 345–352.

History of the Philippines (1565–1898)
Meridians (geography)
Geopolitical rivalry
Zaragoza
Zaragoza
Zaragoza
Zaragoza
Zaragoza
Portugal–Spain relations
1529 in Spain
1529 in Portugal
1529 treaties
Portuguese colonisation in Asia
Spanish exploration in the Age of Discovery